The Philippines national junior handball team is the U-21 national team of the Philippines. It takes part in international handball competitions and is governed by the Philippine Handball Federation.

History
The national team made its international debut at the 2014 IHF Trophy - Zone 1B (Southeast Asia) Zone which took place from 8-12 December, 2014 in Nusajaya, Malaysia. The tournament also saw the national teams of Brunei, Thailand, Singapore and the hosts Malaysia. The Philippines defeated Brunei, also making their debut in international handball, in their opening match with the score 35-6 at the EduCity Indoor Stadium.

Recent Fixtures and Results

References

Men's national junior handball teams
handball junior